The Zoo In Forest Park and Education Center, also known as the Forest Park Zoo, is a nonprofit zoo situated in Forest Park, Springfield, Massachusetts. It spans an area of four acres and is home to a variety of exotic, native, and endangered species.

History 
The Zoo in Forest Park opened in 1894, and was initially run by the city's Parks Department. Animals at the zoo in its first decade included badgers, a bald eagle, bears, a Brazilian marmoset, boars, a buffalo, cockatoos, deer, doves, finches, Java pigeons, a pair of Indian leopards, lions (named Caesar and Calpurnia), lynxes, macaws, monkeys, an ostrich, prairie dogs, a rabbit, red-faced apes, timber wolves, toucans, waterfowl, and a wildcat. Domestic animals included cattle, horses, sheep, and Angora goats. Many of the animals were purchased from the animal show market of Coney Island, although some were donated.

It was not until 1923 that the zoo began systematically labeling animals with their species, name, and origin.

For several years the zoo was owned by Theodor Seuss Geisel's father. The zoo inspired Geisel's children's book If I Ran The Zoo.

During World War ll the zoo replaced the standard beef given to carnivores with horse meat. The smaller animals were fed grain, acorns, and stale bread along with their standards vegetables.

Well-known animals over the years included Jiggs the chimpanzee (until 1967), Snowball the polar bear (1951-1979), and Morganetta the elephant (1965-1980). Both Jiggs and Snowball were taxidermied and donated to the Springfield Science Museum.

The zoo faced financial difficulties in the 1970s, leading to many of the animals being sold off. In 1976 the zoo received negative media attention as the result of their inclusion in a book titled Living Trophies: A Shocking Look at the Conditions in America's Zoos. In 1979 a proposal for a new $2.7 million zoo was unveiled, but it received little public support. In 1980 the Springfield Parks Commission officially voted against the proposal.

In early 1982 the zoo was officially demolished in the name of aesthetic improvements. However, a zoo did remain in Forest Park: the James P. Heady Kiddieland Zoo, a petting zoo, which was relocated to elsewhere in the park. After the closing and demolition of the original Forest Park Zoo, the Kiddieland Zoo was often referred to at the Forest Park Zoo. It was eventually expanded, and in 1986 the zoo received a $1 million grant from the Massachusetts government for the redevelopment and relocation of the zoo.

In June 2016 one of the zoo's guenon monkeys, Dizzy, escaped his enclosure and made his way into Forest Park. He was re-captured several days later.

The zoo temporarily closed in response to the COVID-19 pandemic, but was able to re-open with restrictions in June 2020.

Operations 
The zoo operates from late March until early November.

During the hottest days of summer, some animals are kept inside, with the floors of their enclosures kept free of hay, and staff provide animals with ice.

Programs

Adopt an Animal 
The Zoo offers the opportunity to become closer to the animals by 'adopting them': assisting in supporting the cost of their food and care. Any individual or group can adopt an animal. Most animals are adopted by more than one person or group.

The program launched in 1989 as a way to raise money for animals' food and veterinary care.

Animals 
Most of the animals at the zoo (~85%) are unable to be released in the wild due to injury, illness, or familiarity with humans.

Animals residing at the Zoo In Forest Park and Education Center include:

Events

Brew at the Zoo 
Brew at the Zoo is an annual fundraiser featuring local breweries, held since 2017.

Eggstravaganza 
Eggstravaganza is the zoo's annual Easter event, held the Saturday before Easter.

Spooky Safari 
Spooky Safari is the zoo's annual Halloween event. Stations are set up within the zoo for trick-or-treating, and additional activities like crafts and face painting are also offered. This event is the successor to "Halloween Happening", which first occurred in 1988.

Wine Safari 
Wine Safari is an annual fundraiser event held since 2018, where guests taste test different wines and are able to meet animals from the regions where the different wines are produced.

Awards 

 2021: Educational Award of Excellence; Zoological Association of America
 2022: Educational Award of Excellence; Zoological Association of America

See also 
 Forest Park (Springfield, Massachusetts)

External links
Official Website

References

Buildings and structures in Springfield, Massachusetts
Tourist attractions in Springfield, Massachusetts
Zoos in Massachusetts